Dan Voiculescu (born September 25, 1946), also known as "Varanul" or "Felix Voiculescu", is a Romanian politician and businessman. He is the founder and former president of the Romanian Humanist Party (PUR), later renamed the Conservative Party (PC). He was a senator from 2004 until his resignation in 2012.

Dan Voiculescu was one of the richest men in Romania, with a fortune estimated at 1.5–1.6 billion euros, according to Top 300 Richest Romanian People launched by the Capital magazine in October 2009. The Intact Media Group, founded by Dan Voiculescu, includes several major television stations (most notably Antena 1 and Antena 3), radio stations, as well as top newspapers and magazines (most notably Jurnalul Naţional and Gazeta Sporturilor). According to Top 300 issued by Capital, developing televisions and launching GSP TV and Radio station ZU, as well as strengthening the print media, have been among the main directions that have marked the group's businesses in 2008.

Early life
Voiculescu was born in Bucharest, in a family of modest means, who lived in the Bariera Vergului neighborhood. For his secondary studies, he went to the Emil Racoviţă High School. Starting in 1969, he studied at the Academy of Economic Studies (ASE) in Bucharest, obtaining a B.A. in 1974, and a Ph.D in 1977. In 1991, he obtained a Ph.D. in economics from the unaccredited Pacific Western University (Hawaii), in Honolulu, Hawaii, and became a professor at ASE.

According to the autobiography published on the official website, he was born in a modest family, his father being a plumber and his mother a housewife. He grew up in the Bucharest neighborhood of Bariera Vergului, near the 23 August skating rink, where he practiced ice hockey. In 1969 he fulfilled the military service in a military unit in Focsani.

Before the 1989 revolution, he lived in a state rental house and drove a Dacia purchased in installments. Working in the foreign trade, of his allowance of $7 per day, he was able – according to the same autobiography - to gather over 21 years, 30 thousand dollars, which he deposited to BRCE and have been the starting capital of the GRIVCO group.

Political activities

In 1991, Voiculescu founded the Humanist Party of Romania, which changed its name to the Conservative Party (PC) in May 2005. Under Voiculescu's leadership, the party also markedly changed its doctrine to embrace conservative values in line with the views of the European People's Party in the European Parliament. The PC, however, did not join the European People's Party.

The PC, then called the PUR, supported the Social Democratic Party (PSD)-led government from 2000 to 2004, and ran in coalition with the PSD in the 2004 parliamentary and presidential elections.

The PC was also part of the ruling coalition led by Prime Minister Călin Popescu-Tăriceanu from December 2004 until the party withdrew in 2006. According to Freedom House, one reason the government of Popescu-Tăriceanu included the small PC, which received support from only 2 percent of the population, was due to the strength of Voiculescu family's Antenna 1 television station. Tom Gallagher, a Romania specialist at Bradford University, stated in January 2005, shortly after the PC entered the government, that Voiculescu "is a potentially major problem if the government decides to introduce legislation that will challenge vested interests which have profited through the questionable sale of state assets."

PC ran in a coalition with PSD in the 2008 legislative elections, and Voiculescu was elected senator in a Bucharest district.

As member of the Romanian Senate, Voiculescu has been strong in his opposition to Romanian President Traian Băsescu, who he states has exceeded constitutional boundaries and abused power. In March, 2007, he established a special commission within the Parliament to investigate Băsescu's actions as president and sponsored the legislation in the Parliament that led to a national referendum over whether Băsescu should remain in office. Voiculescu was also strongly opposed to former Minister of Justice Monica Macovei.

In April 2007, the Parliamentary Committee led by Senator Dan Voiculescu managed, for the first time in the post-revolutionary Romania, the suspension of an acting president. The report drawn up by the "Voiculescu Committee" was adopted in the Romanian Parliament, with 322 votes "for" and 108 "against"; President Traian Băsescu was thus suspended from his function.

Voiculescu opposed a draft law proposed by Justice Minister Monica Macovei and supported by the European Commission to set up a special agency for checking assets declarations for MPs and other senior officials. He subsequently supported a version characterized as "watered down" by the international media.

In September 2007, Dan Voiculescu resigned from his senator function as a form of protest against the blocking in the Romanian Parliament, of various important social laws. They were about promoting his projects on extending the contracts of tenants in the nationalized houses, reducing VAT on food, solidarity fund for pensioners and non-taxation of reinvested profits, legislation designed to bring more money to pensioners with low incomes, to lower prices on basic food or assist companies to reinvest their profits.

In November 2008, by occasion of the first elections held in the plurality system, Dan Voiculescu returned to the Romanian Parliament, obtaining 21,708 votes in the 8th college in Bucharest, and in December 2008 he was elected Vice-President of the Senate of Romania, with 83 votes for and 2 against.

Voiculescu's Law 
Voiculescu initiated a bill, now named after him, that allows tenants of buildings that were nationalized during communism to stay in them, while the former owners receive only financial compensation. After a long legislative and constitutional battle, president Băsescu signed it into law in 2009, even though he and his party opposed it. Emil Boc's government however did not apply it, and was sued by tenants' associations.

Secret police involvement
Although he denied it for several years, in 2006 Voiculescu admitted having been a collaborator of the Securitate, Romania's communist-era internal intelligence service, after information to this effect was released publicly by Romania's National Council for the Study of the Securitate Archives (CNSAS). At the time, Voiculescu was named to be a Vice Premier in the Popescu-Tăriceanu government, but was ultimately not allowed to take the position because of his involvement with the communist secret police.

CNSAS revealed that Voiculescu acted as an informer for the Securitate by the names of "Felix" and "Mircea". He later claimed that he only collaborated "two or three times" for economic espionage., and he had cooperated with the Securitate as "all Romanians did" during the communist period. The latter statement drew criticism from journalist Cristian Tudor Popescu, who wrote that "Mr. Voiculescu knows very well there were millions of Romanians who didn't have anything to do with the Securitate and others who simply refused to work for it." Voiculescu denies, however, having been an official collaborator (with a signed agreement) or an officer of the Securitate and is appealing the CNSAS' ruling to that effect. He has said he will resign from the Senate if the verdict is not overturned on appeal. He blamed the initial findings against him on Băsescu, who, according to Voiculescu, launched a campaign to undermine him.

Tom Gallagher wrote in a 2004 paper that it is supposed that Dan Voiculescu held the rank of General within the  intelligence service before Romania's 1989 anti-communist revolution, but nothing has been proved till now. Ziua newspaper commented however that if Voiculescu was a "covert general" this fact would be extremely hard to prove; official records show that Voiculescu was a reserve army sub-lieutenant.

In July 2006, Camelia Voiculescu, the owner of Jurnalul Naţional, asked for editor Dorin Tudoran's resignation, following an editorial in which he criticized her father, Dan Voiculescu, for his past association with the Securitate.

A verdict however unattested by the Justice, according to the law. The case is pending.

On March 5, 2010, the Court of Appeal upheld that Dan Voiculescu has collaborated with the Securitate during the communist regime, having the conspiratorial name “Felix”. Subsequently, the decision was appealed to the Supreme Court, which upheld the Court of Appeal solution.

Corruption investigation
The Romanian National Anti-corruption Department (DNA) announced on April 3, 2007, that it was investigating Voiculescu, his daughter, and several business associates for money laundering, with regard to funds obtained through the national lottery. Voiculescu denied all the charges, claiming the investigation was politically motivated and that the transactions were legal.

Voiculescu has been accused of other corruption scandals, including an alleged scheme whereby Grivco, a company he owned, bought electrical energy from the state-controlled Rovinari complex, and sold the energy back to Electrica, another state-controlled company, at a large profit. Through a spokesman, Voiculescu declined to comment, on the grounds that in December 2004, at the time the contract was signed, he was just a shareholder, and not an administrator of Grivco.

In October 2009, following some articles in the press, the Vice-President of the Romanian Senate, Dan Voiculescu, has undergone a vetting process carried out by the National Agency for Fiscal Administration (ANAF), verification based on which ANAF has established  that the allegations surrounding the Senator Dan Voiculescu have no real basis.

On September 26, 2013, Dan Voiculescu was found guilty and sentenced to 5 years in prison. In the case of using his political connections to influence the  sell of the Institute for Alimentary Research to Grivco a company that he had a stake in. The case was postponed several years because Dan Voiculescu resigned several times from the Romanian Parliament.

On August 8, 2014, Dan Voiculescu was found guilty an sentenced to 10 years in prison for money laundering. Money, a plot of land and a house were also confiscated to cover the state's losses.

On July 10, 2017, he was released from prison.

Criticism 
President Băsescu has accused Voiculescu of being a "media mogul" who uses his media group to fight political battles. He further accused Voiculescu of trying to control, through the media, the politics of the country. In May 2007, Băsescu said "Oligarchs should not be confused with the business community.
They are the few who have made fortunes thanks to facilities from government, people who have become very rich and now give orders to politicians, those who are supported financially by the oligarchs and who have turned into puppets of certain businessmen like Voiculescu, [Rompetrol owner Dinu] Patriciu, and many others." An Organization for Security and Co-operation in Europe report on the 2009 presidential election found that the newspaper Jurnalul Naţional and television station Antena 1, both owned by Voiculescu's family, were biased against the incumbent Băsescu. In the last years, Voiculescu tried to reinvent his public image through the Internet. He started a personal blog, showing a much lighter side of his personality, and even began writing satirical guest posts for online journals non-related to his media empire.

See also 
 List of corruption scandals in Romania

References

External links
  Profile at the Romanian Chamber of Deputies site

Leaders of political parties in Romania
Conservative Party (Romania) politicians
Members of the Senate of Romania
Businesspeople from Bucharest
Newspaper publishers (people)
Romanian mass media owners
Securitate informants
Academic staff of the Bucharest Academy of Economic Studies
Bucharest Academy of Economic Studies alumni
Politicians from Bucharest
Living people
1946 births
Romanian politicians convicted of corruption
Romanian prisoners and detainees
Prisoners and detainees of Romania